Rhynchospermum is a genus of flowering plants within the tribe Astereae within the family Asteraceae.

Species
The only accepted species is Rhynchospermum verticillatum, native to China, Japan, the Indian Subcontinent, and Southeast Asia (Myanmar, Thailand, Vietnam, Malaysia, Maluku)

References

Flora of Asia
Astereae
Monotypic Asteraceae genera
Plants described in 1825